Banu Khattab was a wealthy Ibadi dynasty of Hawwara origin that thrived off of the Trans-Saharan slave trade. It ruled over Zawila and the surrounding oases in the Fezzan region from 918/919 until 1172-1177 when it was sacked and conquered by the Armenian-Mamluk Qaraqush. The instability created by Qaraqush was exploited by the Kanem, who under the reign of Dunama Dabbalemi had seized control of the Fezzan, establishing a new capital at Traghan, a few miles west of Zawila.

They would later go on to rule the Fezzan again under the nominal control of the Hafsids in the 15th century.

See also
Awlad Muhammad
Kanem–Bornu Empire
Ottoman Tripolitania

References 

Ibadi Islam
Fezzan
Berber dynasties
918 establishments
1177 disestablishments